Eencuentro Con El Milenio is the fourth studio album released by Los Mismos on November 16, 1999.

Track listing

References

1999 albums
Spanish-language albums
Los Mismos albums